The Ministry of Planning and Investment (MPI), formerly the Committee of State Planning, is a governmental ministry charged with the role of state management over planning and investment. The ministry's headquarters is located in Hanoi.

The agency provides, among others, strategic advice for country-level socio-economic development.  It also programs and plans economic management mechanisms and policies for the national economy, for specific sectors as well as for domestic and foreign investments.

Foreign investment in Vietnam is governed under the Law on Foreign Investment and its related regulations, decrees and circulars.  The four main types of foreign investments in Vietnam are:
Joint Ventures
Business Cooperation (Contracts)
100-Percent Foreign-Owned Enterprises
Build-Operate-Transfer enterprises

See also
 Economy of Vietnam
 Government of Vietnam
 Ministry of Finance, Vietnam
 List of company registers

References

External links 
 Ministry of Planning and Investment homepage

Planning and Investment
Economy of Vietnam
Vietnam
Governmental office in Hanoi
Vietnam